The 2016–17 Atlantic 10 Conference men's basketball season was the 41st season of Atlantic 10 Conference basketball. The 2017 Atlantic 10 men's basketball tournament was held at the PPG Paints Arena in Pittsburgh, Pennsylvania from March 8–12, 2017. Dayton won the regular season championship. Rhode Island won the A-10 Tournament by beating VCU in the tournament championship. As a result, Rhode Island received the conference's automatic bid to the NCAA tournament. Three A-10 teams received bids to the NCAA Tournament: Dayton, VCU, and Rhode Island. Both Dayton and VCU lost in the first round while Rhode Island lost in the second round. Richmond received the conference's sole bid to the National Invitation Tournament while George Mason and George Washington received bids to the College Basketball Invitational.

Head coaches

Coaching changes 
On March 10, 2016, Saint Louis head coach Jim Crews was released from his coaching duties by the school.  On March 30, the school hired Travis Ford as head coach.

Coaches 

Notes:
 All records, appearances, titles, etc. are from time with current school only.
 Overall and A-10 records are from time at current school and are before the beginning of the season.

Preseason

Preseason poll 
Prior to the season at the conference's annual media day, awards and a poll were chosen by a panel of the league’s head coaches and select media members.

Preseason All-Conference Teams

Regular season

Early season tournaments

Conference matrix 
This table summarizes the head-to-head results between teams in conference play. Each team played 18 conference games: 1 game vs. 8 opponents (4 home, 4 away) and 2 games against 5 opponents (home and away).

Weekly honors
Throughout the conference regular season, the Atlantic 10 offices name a player of the week and rookie of the week each Monday.

Conference Awards

Rankings

Postseason

2017 A-10 tournament

NCAA tournament 

The Atlantic 10 Conference received three bids to the 2017 NCAA Division I men's basketball tournament.

National Invitation tournament 

Richmond received the sole NIT bid for the conference.

College Basketball Invitational 

George Mason and George Washington received bids to the CBI.

References